Franz Viehböck (born 15 October 1938) is a retired Austrian football defender who played for Austria. He also played for SVS Linz and Linzer ASK.

External links
 
 

1938 births
Austrian footballers
Austria international footballers
Association football defenders
LASK players
LASK managers
Living people
Austrian football managers